Caleb Jones may refer to:

Caleb Landry Jones, American actor and musician
Caleb Jones (The Passage), fictional character
Caleb Jones (politician), in the Missouri House of Representatives
Caleb Jones (ice hockey), American ice hockey player
Caleb Jones (javelin thrower) (born 1991), Canadian javelin thrower and national champion
Caleb Jones (–1816), loyalist and defendant in the 1799 freedom suit R v Jones (New Brunswick)
Caleb Jones (American football), American football player

See also 
 Caleb Johnson